"Think About the Way" is a single by German dance band Groove Coverage featuring vocals / rap from Rameez. The single was released digitally on March 16, 2012 in Germany as the third single from their fourth studio album Riot on the Dancefloor. The song was written by Roberto Zanetti and produced by Axel Konrad, Ole Wierk, Verena Rehm.

Adaptation

Parts of the song including the refrain are taken from an earlier 1994 hit by British hip-house / eurodance artist Ice MC entitled "Think About the Way". The Ice MC dance hit had featured Alexia on vocals. The song had been an international hit for Ice MC (real name Ian Campbell) with top 10 appearances in Belgium, Italy and Switzerland, and top 20 showing in France, Germany, Netherlands and Sweden and made it to number 38 in the UK Top 40 charts.

Groove Coverage's release contains however some additional lyrics not found in the original Ice MC hit making it a new song rather than a straight cover of the original.

Music video
A music video to accompany the release of "Think About the Way" was first released onto YouTube on 6 March 2012 at a total length of three minutes and forty-seven seconds.

Track listing

Chart performance

Release history

References

2012 singles
Groove Coverage songs
Songs written by Roberto Zanetti
2012 songs
Sony Music singles